Sphigmothorax is a genus of longhorn beetles of the subfamily Lamiinae, containing the following species:

 Sphigmothorax bicinctus Gressitt, 1939
 Sphigmothorax rondoni (Breuning, 1965)
 Sphigmothorax tricinctus Gressitt, 1951
 Sphigmothorax tsushimanus Hayashi, 1961

References

Desmiphorini